The Amarakaeri Communal Reserve (Reserva Comunal Amarakaeri) is a protected area in Peru located in the Madre de Dios Region, Manú Province. It protects parts of the Southwest Amazon moist forests and Peruvian Yungas ecoregions.

Located in the reserve is the geomorphological made "Harakbut Face" that resembles a man's face. It is known by the native Harakbut tribesmen as the Rostro, which means face in their native language.

See also 
 Natural and Cultural Peruvian Heritage
 Uncontacted peoples

References

External links 
 www.parkswatch.org / Amarakaeri Communal Reserve

Communal reserves of Peru
Geography of Madre de Dios Region